Kristine L. Svinicki (born September 6, 1966) is an American nuclear engineer and former chairwoman of the Nuclear Regulatory Commission.

Early life and education
Svinicki, who is one of seven siblings, was born in Jackson, Michigan. Both of her parents died when she was a teenager. She earned a bachelor's degree in nuclear engineering from the University of Michigan in 1988.

Career
Svinicki began her career as an energy engineer for the state of Wisconsin at the Wisconsin Public Service Commission. She worked as a nuclear engineer in the U.S. Department of Energy's Washington, D.C. Offices of Nuclear Energy, Science and Technology, and of Civilian Radioactive Waste Management, as well as its Idaho Operations Office. She served as a staff member on the Senate Armed Services Committee for Sen. John Warner and Sen. John McCain.

Svinicki has a history of making political donations to Republican candidates.

She was sworn in as a commissioner of the NRC on March 28, 2008, and for a second term ending June 30, 2017. She was designated chairwoman by President Donald Trump on January 23, 2017. On June 26, 2017, she was confirmed by the U.S. Senate to a five-year term as the NRC's chairperson.
She resigned as Commissioner and chairwoman on January 20, 2021.

At the time of her departure from the NRC, she thanked President Trump: “I was humbled when President Trump designated me NRC Chairman on Inauguration Day four years ago. After nine years of service as a Commissioner, I hope I put my prior experience to good effect and that my work as Chairman has fulfilled, in some small measure, the confidence the President expressed in my capabilities in offering me this opportunity to lead.”

References

External links
NRC Profile Page 

1966 births
Living people
Nuclear Regulatory Commission officials
People associated with nuclear power
University of Michigan College of Engineering alumni
George W. Bush administration personnel
Obama administration personnel
Trump administration personnel
United States congressional aides